Arslaan is an Indian fantasy television series which aired on Sony Entertainment Television from 13 July 2008 to 19 October 2008. It is the story of a young boy with supernatural powers, set 3000 years in the past. Neil Bhatt plays the lead role as Arslaan. It is based on the Persian epic of Amir Arsalan.

Plot 
Arslaan must defeat the evil Zakfaar. He goes on many adventures with his friends while Zakfaar follows him. The story ends when he takes a gem from Ibleez and uses it to defeat Zakfaar.

Cast 
 Neil Bhatt as Arslaan
 Mukul Dev as Zakfaar
 Annie Gill as Rudabeh
 Praneet Bhat as Shefan
 Kishwer Merchant as Mikawi
 Manasi Varma as Aaira
 Puneetchandra Sharma as Aurang
 Amit Pachori

References

2008 Indian television series debuts
2008 Indian television series endings
Sony Entertainment Television original programming
Indian children's television series
Indian fantasy television series
Persian mythology in popular culture
Television series set in ancient history